Marcelo González (born 24 November 1965) is an Argentine luger. He competed in the men's singles event at the 2002 Winter Olympics.

References

External links
 

1965 births
Living people
Argentine male lugers
Olympic lugers of Argentina
Lugers at the 2002 Winter Olympics
People from Campana, Buenos Aires
Sportspeople from Buenos Aires Province